"Shake That" is a song recorded by Australian singer Samantha Jade featuring American rapper Pitbull. "Shake That" was written by Antonio Dixon, Kenny "Babyface" Edmonds, Khristopher Riddick-Tynes, Carmen Reece, Leon Thomas III, Jonathan Percy Starker Saxe and Armando Pérez, and produced by Babyface, Antonio Dixon and The Rascals. It was released on 17 July 2015, as the lead single from Jade's second studio album, Nine, and debuted at number thirty-two on the Australian ARIA singles chart. The song's accompanying music video was released on the same day via YouTube and Vevo.

Background and promotion
"Shake That" was recorded and mixed in Los Angeles in January 2015. According to Jade, she "heard it at the studio while we were writing something else and I was like, 'We need to pause on this song and I need to record this right now!' It just had this great feel and message, so we got straight to it and now it's my single!" Pitbull was added months later when Jade felt that the song was missing a bridge. She felt that "Pitbull was perfect because of the track feeling like a real 'him' sort of song. So we sent it out and hoped to god that he'd say 'yes' and he did." He later recorded the bridge in Miami. Jade's first TV performance of the song was on 26 July 2015, on Australia's Dancing with the Stars. On 30 July 2015, she performed the song on Australian morning shows, Sunrise and The Morning Show. It peaked at number 32 on the ARIA Singles Chart.

After announcing and releasing for pre-order the follow-up single "Always", originally intended for release on 6 November 2015, Jade changed course and decided to give "Shake That" a second promotional push, with a performance on The X Factor Australia on 10 November 2015. The performance managed to send the song to a new peak of #19 on the iTunes Singles Chart, however it failed to reach a new peak on the ARIA Singles Chart, re-entering at #69. Jade performed the song again on The Morning Show on 20 November 2015, the day that Nine was released.

Music video
The official music video for "Shake That" was released on the same day as the song via YouTube and Vevo. It was directed by filmmaker and actress Gracie Otto. Jade's scenes were shot in a luxury home on Sydney's north shore, where she had done a Marie Claire shoot only weeks beforehand, while Pitbull filmed his scenes in Miami. It is a beauty video in which Jade poses and dances seductively in a variety of glamorous outfits while Pitbull looks on.

Track listing

Personnel
Credits adapted from Discogs.

Samantha Jade: lead vocals, writer
Armando Perez (Pitbull): featured artist, writer
Kenny "Babyface" Edmonds: writer, producer
Antonio Dixon: writer, producer
The Rascals: producers
Carmen Reece: writer, vocal producer, background vocals
Khristopher Riddick-Tynes: writer

Jonathan Percy Starker Saxe: writer
Leon Thomas III: writer
Randy Ellis: alto saxophone
Garrett Smith: trombone
Andrew Carney, Chris Bautista: trumpet
Paul Boutin: recording, mixing
Tom Coyne: mastering

Charts

Release history

References

2015 songs
2015 singles
Samantha Jade songs
Sony Music Australia singles
Songs written by Pitbull (rapper)
Songs written by Babyface (musician)
Songs written by Antonio Dixon (songwriter)
Songs written by Carmen Reece
Songs written by Leon Thomas III
Songs written by Khristopher Riddick-Tynes
Songs written by JP Saxe